The 2022 NCAA Division I Wrestling Championships took place from March 17–19, 2022, in Detroit, Michigan at the Little Caesars Arena. The tournament is the 91st NCAA Division I Wrestling Championship.

Team results 

 Note: Top 10 only
 (H): Team from hosting U.S. state

Individual results 

 (H): Individual from hosting U.S. State

Source:

References 

NCAA Division I Wrestling Championships
NCAA Division I Wrestling Championships
NCAA Division I Wrestling Championships
Wrestling in the United States
Wrestling in Michigan
NCAA Division I Wrestling Championships